Osteochilus enneaporos is a species of cyprinid fish found from Thailand to Indonesia.

References

Taxa named by Pieter Bleeker 
Fish described in 1852
Osteochilus